Liu Jing may refer to:

 Liu Jing (Prince of Guangling) (died 67), Eastern Han Dynasty prince, son of Emperor Guangwu
 Liu Jing (Prince of Langya) (died 81), Eastern Han Dynasty prince, son of Emperor Guangwu
 Liu Jing (Ming Dynasty), rebel leader in the late Ming Dynasty and early Qing Dynasty
 Liu Jing (politician) (born 1944), Chinese politician
 Liu Jing (actor) (born 1963), Chinese actor
 Jing Liu (architect) (born 1980), Chinese-born architect

Sportspeople
Liu Jing (footballer, born 1997), Chinese footballer
 Liu Jing (footballer, born 1998), Chinese footballer
 Liu Jing (runner) (born 1971), Chinese middle-distance runner
 Liu Jing (hurdler) (born 1977), Chinese hurdler
 Liu Jing (rower) (born 1987), Chinese rower
 Liu Jing (table tennis) (born 1988), Chinese para table tennis player
 Liu Jing (speed skater) (born 1988), Chinese speed skater
 Liu Jing (swimmer) (born 1990), Chinese swimmer